Street Customs Berlin is a reality series about West Coast Customs' franchise in Berlin that aired for one season on TLC and Discovery Channel, starring Ryan Friedlinghaus.

Episodes

Season 1 
 The Grand Opening
 The Taller the Guys, the Smaller the Cars
 The Bloodhound Bus
 The Style Police
 Gift On Wheels
 Shop or Drop

See also
 Street Customs

External links
 WestCoastCustoms.com
 WCC-europe.com.

German reality television series
TLC (TV network) original programming